Seren Bundy-Davies (born 30 December 1994) is a Welsh track and field sprinter who competes in the 400 metres for Great Britain. She came to international prominence at the 2015 European Athletics Indoor Championships, winning bronze in the 400 metres and silver in the 4 × 400 metres relay. She won a Bronze medal in the 4 × 400 m relay at the 2015 World Championships in Athletics.

Career

Early years and breakthrough
Born to Welsh parents in Greater Manchester, she grew up in the city and was educated at Wilmslow High School. After playing numerous sports in school, she was picked out at age 17 by coach Steve Ball of Trafford Athletic Club, after finishing 4th over 400m at English School's Championships.

Joining Trafford Athletic Club and coached by Ball, she now competes for TAC and the University of Manchester, where under a sport scholarship she is studying for a biomedical science degree. She broke through at national level in 2014, placing fourth at the British Athletics Championships. She was the Welsh senior champion that year, and improved her personal best to 52.50 seconds to become the Welsh record holder.

2015 season
At the Birmingham Indoor Grand Prix at the start of 2015 she ran a personal best of 51.72 seconds to win the race. This run took Bundy-Davies top of the European Indoor rankings, and despite a fall in the British Athletics Indoor Championships, she was selected to represent Great Britain for the first time at the 2015 European Athletics Indoor Championships. There she won a bronze in the 400 metres, and a silver in 4 × 400 metres relay teamed with Laura Maddox, Kirsten McAslan and Kelly Massey.

In her first outdoor race of the 2015 season at Nivelles, Belgium in June, she lowered her personal best to 51.72secs. She then choose to compete at the 2015 European Athletics U23 Championships in Tallinn, Estonia, finishing fourth in the individual 400m, and being part of the Great Britain and Northern Ireland team that claimed gold in the 4 × 400 m relay. She then ran a personal best at the London Anniversary Games in July with 51.48 in the 400m, coming in seventh. However, although these performances gained her selection for the GB relay team at the 2015 World Championships in Athletics in Beijing, China, under UK Athletics policy due to competing in an international Under23 competition she was made ineligible for individual 400m selection, despite meeting the required standard.

References

External links

Living people
British female sprinters
Welsh female sprinters
Sportspeople from Manchester
People from Wilmslow
1994 births
World Athletics Championships athletes for Great Britain
World Athletics Championships medalists
Athletes (track and field) at the 2016 Summer Olympics
Olympic athletes of Great Britain
European Athletics Championships medalists
Olympic female sprinters